Tinkay Ka Sahara is a Pakistani television series which first broadcast on Hum TV on 26 September 2022. It is written by Zanjabeel Asim Shah and directed by Zeeshan Ahmed. The series stars Sonya Hussyn, Sami Khan, Haroon Shahid and Rabab Hashim in lead roles.

Plot
Qadar is an orphan maiden who lives with her married sister, Romana. Romana's mother-in-law is not fond of Qadar and gets rid of her. With the help of a matchmaker, she marries her with an idle a lazy guy, Hammad who does nothing all the day but rest, for which he is taunted by all of his family members. After their marriage, Qadar feels it and decided to bring his honour back. An expert of cooking, she starts her own catering business with Hamamd and transforms her into a diligent and honourable man. It develops their relationship further and they both fall in love.

On the other hand, Wasay is a self-made businessman and has anger management issues. He is married to Durriya who is a girl that admires lavish lifestyle and doesn't care about her husband's personality....until she realizes that Wasay is mistreating her emotionally and physically. Wasay was being manipulated by his own sister who is planning to attain all of Wasay's property.

Cast 
 Sonya Hussyn as Qadar
 Haroon Shahid as Hammad
 Sami Khan as Vasay
 Rabab Hashim as Duriya
 Saba Faisal as Hammad's mother
 Ayesha Toor as Adeela
 Subhan Awan as Salman
 Adnan Jaffar as Imran
 Sana Askari as Aimen
 Naveed Raza
Salma Asimas Duriya's mother
 Akbar Islam as Duriya's father
 Afsheen Hayat as Romana

Production 
In September 2021, in an interview with an online portal screenwriter Zanjabeel Asim Shah revealed the title of one of her upcoming projects, Tinkay Ka Sahara. The principal photography began in August 2022. The first teaser of the series was released on 3 September 2022.

Reception 
The show received positive reviews right from the beginning. Sonia Hussain and Haroon Shahid were praised for their performances. It received high views on YouTube and good ratings on TV. The first episode got 4.2 TRPs, 2nd episode got 4.4 TRPs and the 3rd episode got 6.3 TRPs. The ratings further increased as the 4th and 5th episodes fetched 5.6 and 5.5 TRPs. The twist in the 7th episode made the show receive 6.1 TRPs. And the next episode again got good ratings of 6.9 TRPs. 9th episode received ratings of 5.9 TRPs. 10th episode received 5.9 TRPs.

References 

Hum TV original programming
Pakistani television series